Mohammad Junaid (born 21 March 2002) is a Pakistani cricketer. He made his Twenty20 debut for Peshawar in the 2018–19 National T20 Cup on 13 December 2018. A month before his T20 debut, he was named as the emerging player for the Multan Sultans in the draft for the 2019 Pakistan Super League. He made his List A debut on 24 January 2021, for Balochistan, in the 2020–21 Pakistan Cup.

References

External links
 

2002 births
Living people
Pakistani cricketers
Balochistan cricketers
Peshawar cricketers
Multan Sultans cricketers
Place of birth missing (living people)